Phaoniini is a tribe in the fly family Muscidae. It contains the largest Muscid genus Phaonia.

Genera
Chaetophaonia Carvalho & Nihei, 2005
Dolichophaonia Carvalho, 1993
Helina  Robineau-Desvoidy, 1830
Lophosceles  Ringdahl, 1922
Phaonia  Robineau-Desvoidy, 1830
Souzalopesmyia Albuquerque, 1951

References

Muscidae
Diptera of Europe
Diptera of North America
Taxa named by John Russell Malloch